Hilarempis adrianus is a species of dance flies, in the fly family Empididae.

References

Hilarempis
Insects described in 1969
Diptera of Africa